The Windsor Festival International String Competition is a music competition held in the United Kingdom for performers of violin, cello, and viola. The event is held biennially at Windsor Castle in Windsor. It aims to seeks out exceptional young string soloists, and to, through the prize package, launch the winner’s professional career.

History 
In 2008, Windsor Festival launched its International String Competition in honour of Sir Yehudi Menuhin.

Competition format 
The first round is judged by submission of a video, and eight candidates out of around 200 applicants proceed through to the live rounds in Windsor, UK. The Semi-finals see each competitor perform a 45-minute public recital. Three go through to the Final round, where they compete by playing a 25-minute public recital in front of an audience in the Waterloo Chamber of the Windsor Castle. Prizes are presented by Festival Patron, HRH The Earl of Wessex.

In 2019 the number of accepted Semi-finalists increased from eight to twelve candidates. In 2021 with the global Covid-19 pandemic restricting travel across the world the competition was held virtually.

Past winners

2009 competition 
The overall winner of the 2nd WFISC was Diana Galyvdyte from Lithuania who also won the Audience Prize, as voted for by the audience on the night of the Final. The Second Prize went to Savitri Grier.

2011 competition 
The overall winner of the 3rd WFISC was Yuki Ito from Japan. The Second Prize went to Jiafeng Chen, and Third Prize was awarded to Michael Petrov, who also won the Audience Prize, as voted for by the audience on the night of the Final. The judging panel for the final consisted of Eugene Sarbu, Paul Silverthorne, Gustav Rivinius, Owain Arwel Hughes CBE, and Sean Bishop.

2013 competition 
The winner of the 4th WFISC was Benjamin Baker from New Zealand. Baker also won the Audience Prize, as voted for by the audience on the night of the Final. The Second Prize went to Yuka Ishizuka, and Third Prize was awarded to Marisol Lee. The judging panel for the final consisted of Erich Gruenberg, Paul Silverthorne, Thomas Demenga, David Whelton, and Alexander Van Ingen.

2015 competition 
The overall winner of the 5th WFISC was Ji Yoon Lee from South Korea. The Second Prize went to Timothy Ridout from Britain, and Third Prize was awarded to Elina Buksha from Latvia, who also won the Audience Prize, as voted for by the audience on the night of the Final. The judging panel for the final consisted of Erich Gruenberg, Roger Benedict, Raphael Wallfisch, David Whelton, Alexander Van Ingen, and Martin Denny.

See also 
List of classical music competitions#String instruments

References

External links 
 

Violin competitions
Music competitions in the United Kingdom
Windsor Castle